Charlotte Joël (1882 or 1887–1943) was a German photographer.

Career 

Joël teamed up with photographer Marie Heinzelmann around 1918 and opened the photo studio Joël & Heinzelmann in Charlottenburg. She was mainly interested in portrait photography, her portraits of well-known subjects included Walter Benjamin, Marlene Dietrich, Karl Kraus, Hedwig Lachmann or Gustav Landauer.

After Adolf Hitler's rise to power, as a Jew she was no longer able to work in her profession from 1933, but the studio continued under the name "Joël & Heinzelmann" until 1938/39. With the help of her friend Clara Grunwald, Joël came to Landwerk Neuendorf, a Jewish workers' colony and training center, where she worked in the canteen.

Personal life 
On April 19, 1943, Joël was deported from Berlin to the extermination camp Auschwitz II-Birkenau on transport no. 37, where she was murdered.

Legacy 
In 2013, a Stolperstein was laid in Berlin at Klopstockstraße 19 for Charlotte Joel.

Gallery

See also 
 List of victims and survivors of Auschwitz

References

External links 

 Entry for Charlotte Joel in The Central Database of Shoah Victims' Names (here year of birth: 1882) 
 Entry for Charlotte Joel in The Central Database of Shoah Victims' Names (here year of birth: 1887) 
 Wiederständige Künstlerinnen. Lecture by Sabine Krusen on Charlotte Joel, Ilse Schaeffer, Julie Wolfthorn at the Inselgalerie in Berlin, April 19, 2012. Retrieved 2018-10-21.

Photographers from Berlin
People from West Prussia
Portrait photographers
German women photographers
20th-century photographers
German Jews who died in the Holocaust
1880s births
1943 deaths
Year of birth uncertain
20th-century women photographers
20th-century German women